Published by DC Comics, the Green Lantern Corps has at least 7200 members, two per sector (originally 3600 members, one per sector), in addition to assorted other members who fulfil roles other than patrolling. Although seven characters—Alan Scott, Hal Jordan, Guy Gardner, John Stewart, Kyle Rayner, Simon Baz, and Jessica Cruz—are primarily associated with the name, a number of other members of the Corps have appeared in the DC comics.

Eponymous Green Lanterns
These eight characters are most closely associated with the name "Green Lantern" and have been the title characters of Green Lantern comics.

Alan Scott

Alan Scott was the original Green Lantern character created in the Golden Age of Comic Books. Alan created the mantle and identity of Green Lantern by himself and is not associated with the Green Lantern Corps, since his power ring was de-authorized by the Guardians even before his obtaining it. Prior to the Crisis, Scott's ring ran on magic, and not the Central Power Battery of Oa. In September 2011, The New 52 rebooted DC's continuity. In this new timeline, Alan Scott is the modern-day Green Lantern for Earth 2.

Hal Jordan

Hal Jordan was created in 1959 by writer John Broome and artist Gil Kane and first appeared in Showcase #22 (October 1959). Hal Jordan is a reinvention of a previous character called Green Lantern that had appeared in 1940s comic books as the character Alan Scott. Hal Jordan is a member and occasionally leader of the intergalactic police force called the Green Lantern Corps, as well as a founding member of the Justice League. He fights evil across the Universe with a ring that grants him a variety of superpowers.

Guy Gardner

Guy Gardner is a core member of the Green Lantern family of characters, and for a time (late 1980s through mid-1990s) was also a significant member of the Justice League family of characters. He was created by John Broome and Gil Kane (who patterned him after actor Martin Milner) in Green Lantern (vol. 2) #59 (March 1968), although the character was changed significantly in the 1980s by Steve Englehart and Joe Staton who turned him into a jingoistic parody of an ultra-macho "red-blooded American male." This latter remains the character's archetype to this date.

John Stewart

John Stewart was the second African-American superhero to appear in DC Comics. The character was created by Dennis O'Neil and Neal Adams, and first appeared in Green Lantern (vol. 2) #87 (December 1971), when artist Neal Adams came up with the idea of a substitute Green Lantern. Stewart's original design was based on actor Sidney Poitier.

Kyle Rayner

Created by writer Ron Marz and artist Darryl Banks, Rayner first appeared in Green Lantern (vol. 3) #48 (1994), as part of the "Emerald Twilight" storyline, in which DC Comics replaced Green Lantern Hal Jordan with Rayner, who was the sole Green Lantern for years until the late 1990s. He was DC's star Green Lantern into the mid-2000s. During this period, he was also briefly known as Ion.

Simon Baz

Created by writer Geoff Johns and artist Doug Mahnke, Simon first appeared in 2012 following DC's 2011 company-wide relaunch as part of its Green Lantern story arc "Rise of the Third Army", in which Baz replaces Silver Age hero Hal Jordan as the Green Lantern of Earth's sector. Prior to this, the character made an unnamed cameo in The New 52 Free Comic Book Day Special Edition #1. At the time, Baz debuted to a positive critical reaction and over time gained a sizable fanbase. DC later added Baz to its flagship team-up title Justice League of America in 2013.

Jessica Cruz

Created by Geoff Johns, she is a member of the Green Lantern Corps and the Justice League. Jessica Cruz appears briefly in Green Lantern (vol. 5) #20 (July 2013) but does not make her official debut until the last pages of Justice League (vol. 2) #30, when the Ring of Volthoom locates her. She was dubbed "Power Ring" while she was host to the Ring of Volthoom but is not a member of the Crime Syndicate of America. Cruz becomes an official member of the Green Lantern Corps at the end of "The Darkseid War" storyline.

Sojourner Mullein

Created by writer N.K. Jemisin and artist Jamal Campbell and as part of the imprint Young Animal, Sojourner “Jo” Mullein is introduced as an Earth rookie Green Lantern sent to the alien metropolis City Enduring at the edge of the universe in the maxi-series Far Sector. She is a member of the Justice League as featured in "Future State."

Other Green Lanterns of Earth's sector
With the exception of Yalan Gur, these characters have also served as the Green Lantern for Sector 2814 (which includes Mars).

Jade

Vidar

Rond Vidar

Yalan Gur
Yalan Gur is a Green Lantern introduced as part of an effort to reconcile the Golden Age Green Lantern's origin with the later introduction of the Green Lantern Corps. He is a red-scaled, reptilian humanoid, assigned to sector 2814 (Earth's sector) in the 10th century. He first appeared in Green Lantern (vol. 3) #19 (December 1991). 
While Alan Scott, along with the rest of the Justice Society of America, is trapped in Limbo, his mystic lantern sends a projection to Hal Jordan, Guy Gardner, and John Stewart (the Green Lanterns of Earth at the time). After tracing the projection to Scott's home, the lantern tells the story of its origin (effectively retconning the origin of Alan Scott's power).

In the lantern's story, Yalan Gur was once one of the greatest of the Green Lantern Corps, and, in the 10th century by Earth reckoning, the Guardians of the Universe chose to remove the customary weakness to the color yellow from his power ring. Without this limitation, however, he was corrupted by his power, and he came to Earth and enslaved the people of China. The Guardians of the Universe thwarted Yalan by adding a new weakness of wood to his ring, which allowed the club-wielding villagers to overwhelm their oppressor and mortally wound him. The dying Yalan Gur fled into Earth's upper atmosphere, where he merged with his lantern-shaped power battery as he died. His lantern then collided with a fragment of the Starheart and was merged with its magical essence, turning into the Green Flame that becomes the source of Alan Scott's power. The later retcon involving the true reason behind the yellow impurity may mean these events have been retconned out of existence.

In other media
In the film, Justice League, the character is present at the battle during the 10th century, aligned with the Amazons, Humans and Atlanteans against Steppenwolf and his armies. Meeting a more noble fate than his comic book counterpart, Yalan Gur is killed opposing Steppenwolf, with his ring fleeing to find a suitable successor; its departure, whether or not it was by intention of Yalan or the Guardians, becomes a helpful distraction, drawing Steppenwolf's attention to allow a successful assault on him by the Olympian Gods. In Zack Snyder's Justice League, Yalan Gur appears as a "guardian from the sky" alongside the Old Gods, Atlanteans, Amazons and humans who fought against Darkseid and his army of Parademons in around 3000 BC. He shot beams upon Darkseid, who hastily cut his hand and killed him, but his ring flew to find a new wearer worthy of its power away, before Darkseid can get it, thanks to Zeus and his children Ares and Artemis.

Jong Li
Jong Li is a Green Lantern introduced in Green Lantern, Dragon Lord #1 (June 2001), written by Doug Moench and drawn by Paul Gulacy. He is actually Earth's first Green Lantern, and was a monk raised in the Temple of the Dragon Lords in China. When Jong Li was growing up, he was taught of the Dragon Lords, beings who ruled in the "Golden Age" of man, and that under these lords, man prospered. He was taught to renounce all earthly possessions and to live a life of peace and discipline, but then one day a concubine named Jade Moon came to him in his temple, begging for help in trying to escape her bonds. Jong Li tried to help her but failed, and his temple and fellow monks were ravaged by the emperor's troops and their commander. Jong Li later encountered a representative of the Guardians of the Universe who gave him a power ring and a Lantern to "Oppose Evil, Ease Suffering and Protect the Innocent." Jong Li later rescued Jade and learned of Lung Mountain, where the last Dragon Lords supposedly lived. He set out to seek their higher authority and with their Blessing of Fire became the last Dragon Lord of the Earth, finally defeating the evil emperor's forces and saving his people.

Laham
Laham of Scylla is introduced in Green Lantern Corps Quarterly #2 (Autumn 1992). He is killed off-panel during a surprise invasion of his home planet. Upon his death, his ring passes to Waverly Sayre, who becomes good friends with Laham's widow. Laham first physically appears as a statue in the Crypts on Oa.

Waverly Sayre
Waverly Sayre is a pioneer living on the frontier in the early years of the United States. Hoping to start a family, Waverly falls into depression when his wife dies in childbirth, taking their newborn son with her. As he contemplates suicide, the late Laham's ring appears to him and selects him as Laham's successor. Initially believing the ring a manifestation of Satan, Sayre quickly grows into his new role, taking his faithful dog with him on every mission.

Daniel Young
Daniel Young was a sheriff in Montana, in 1873. During his chase of a band of outlaws, Daniel was summoned by Abin Sur, wounded in a battle in deep space. While Abin Sur convalesced in his ship, healed by its machines, Young was a temporary replacement, and he used the power of the ring to bring the outlaws to justice. Afterward, the ring returned to Abin Sur.

Starkadr
Starkadr first appeared in Legends of the DC Universe #20 (September 1999). He is a hulking orange alien who is mortally wounded defending the planet Ungara from the forces of the Traitor. Though he succeeds in driving the Traitor from the planet, Starkadr dies and passes his ring to the Ungaran Abin Sur. He rises as an undead Black Lantern and fights the living Green Lanterns.

Abin Sur

Anya Savenlovich
Anya Savenlovich first appeared in Green Lantern: The New Corps #1 (March 1999). She is a lieutenant colonel from Soviet Air Forces who was in suspended animation after participating in a space mission back in 1964. Kyle Rayner recruited her as a member of the New Corps in a bid to rebuild the Green Lantern Corps. However, finding his attempt was a failure, Kyle took Anya's ring. Aware that the Soviet Union no longer exists, Anya decides to stay in space to find a new purpose.

Green Lantern Corps of Earth
These Green Lanterns were stationed on Earth to safeguard the planet after the events of the Crisis on Infinite Earths.

Arisia Rrab

Ch'p

Katma Tui

Kilowog

Salaak

The Lost Lanterns
During the 1994 "Emerald Twilight" storyline, many of the Corps members are stripped of their rings and left to die out in space. A few of them, however, were captured by the Manhunters and were used as energy sources for the Manhunters until their eventual rescue. They are known as "the Lost Lanterns."

Boodikka

Chaselon
Chaselon is the Green Lantern of sector 1416; he first appeared in Green Lantern (vol. 2) #9 (November–December 1961) in a story written by John Broome and drawn by Gil Kane. Chaselon is a native of Barrio III, a planet inhabited by silicon based crystalline beings with thirteen senses. Barrio III was one of the planets that the mad Guardian Appa Ali Apsa "harvested" to create the planet Mosaic. Chaselon is one of the many Lanterns apparently killed when a maddened Hal Jordan attacks and destroys Oa. Although his shattered body is depicted floating in space, he later is found to be one of the many Lanterns captured by the Cyborg Superman to provide a power source for the new Manhunters. Chaselon and the captured Lanterns are eventually rescued by a revived Hal Jordan.

Chaselon becomes one of the first Alpha Lanterns. He is later smashed to bits by several Black Lanterns, his remains are then immolated when Kyle Rayner ignites his dislodged internal power battery to deal a suicide attack to the assembled Black Lanterns.

Chaselon makes a cameo appearance with other members of the Green Lantern Corps in "The Green Loontern", an episode of the animated television series Duck Dodgers. He also appeared in cameos in Justice League Unlimited and the animated films Green Lantern: First Flight and Green Lantern: Emerald Knights. The character also appears in Green Lantern: The Animated Series, guarding the Guardians' laboratory. Hal distracts him with conversation so Ch'p can rescue Aya before she is dissected. He later joins the bulk of the Corps in an assault on the Manhunters, led by Guy Gardner, who calls him "Disco Lantern."

Graf Toren

Hannu/Honnu
The Green Lantern of Sector 2, he first appeared in Green Lantern (vol. 3) #49 (February 1994), in a story written by Ron Marz. Hannu is among several Lanterns called to defend Oa from the then renegade Hal Jordan. Jordan made short work of him and added his power to his own and left him for dead. He was later found alive on Biot. He is from Ovacron 6 and on his world, it is considered disgraceful and dishonorable to use weapons. He is never seen using his ring in battle (except for life support and travel), preferring his brute strength and fists instead (which prompted Kyle and John to summon him for aid when up against Alpha Lantern Boodikka while under the control of the Cyborg Superman, reasoning that her draining Hannu's ring wouldn't matter as he didn't use it). He finally activates his ring in battle against the Anti-Monitor. Sector 2 is also the home sector of the Reach, creators of the Blue Beetle scarab and sworn enemies of the Guardians. According to their treaty with the Guardians no Green Lantern is allowed in Sector 2 as long as the Reach stays within pre-treaty boundaries. He appears in a cameo in the Green Lantern live-action film and is also a part of the film toyline.

Jack T. Chance

Ke'Haan

Kreon

Laira
Laira is a female humanoid Green Lantern with purple skin and auburn hair. She first appeared in Green Lantern Corps Quarterly #6 (Fall 1993) in the story entitled "What Price Honor?", written by Ruben Diaz.

Laira is from the planet Jayd in space sector 112. She is trained by her father Kentor Omoto to take over his role as a soldier of the Guardians of the Universe; a Green Lantern of her sector. After the disappearance of her father during the Crisis on Infinite Earths and the proclamation by the Guardians that he is dead, she is considered for the post of ring bearer and Green Lantern of her sector. Her instructor turns out to be Ke'Haan of Varva: Kilowog's second in command, known for his tough as nails training. Eager to please and finding a kindred spirit of honor within her teacher, she becomes his prized pupil.

To complete her training, Laira is sent to the city of X'ol on her home planet, where she must confront her father, who is not actually dead.
She is later discovered by a reformed Hal Jordan and Guy Gardner being held captive by the Manhunters with the other "Lost Lanterns" including Kreon and Tomar-Tu. With the help of Jordan and Gardner, the Lost Lanterns put an end to the Manhunter planet of Biot and return to Oa. She then resumes her duties as Green Lantern of her sector.
 
During the Sinestro Corps War event, Laira and the Lost Lanterns come to Hal Jordan's aid on Qward. The group splits up, with Laira, Ke'Haan and Boodikka searching for Ion, and Hal, Graf Toren, and Tomar-Tu looking for John Stewart and Guy Gardner. Laira's group encounters the Anti-Monitor, who kills Ke'Haan in an instant, but they are able to recover Ion and return to Oa.

After preventing the invasion of Coast City by the Sinestro Corps, Laira visits the Crypt of the Green Lanterns to mourn Ke'Haan's death. Hannu reveals their attraction to one another to Boodikka, but explains that (before his death) Ke'Haan refuses Laira because he has a family on his home planet. Laira and the Lost Lanterns set out to his home world to deliver news of his death, only to find that his family has been murdered by Sinestro Corps member Amon Sur. The killer willingly submits to the Lanterns, so that news of his actions will spread. Enraged by this, Laira kills Amon. Afterwards, Laira is held in custody on Oa, while the Lanterns who had seen her crime testify against her. She is placed in the custody of the newly founded Alpha Lanterns, and tried by the Guardians, who find her guilty and strip her of her power ring.

After her trial, Laira is arranged to be transported back to her home world, Jayd, by Hannu. However, a red power ring attacks their ship and chooses Laira as its bearer; making her the second Red Lantern. Under the influence of the red light, Laira's personality degenerates to the point where she is little more than a snarling beast; obsessed with revenge against Sinestro and showing no recognition when confronted by Hal Jordan and John Stewart. During a skirmish on the prison planet Ysmault with multiple Lanterns, Hal managed to reach Laira who was able to see past her rage, and regained some control even asking Jordan for help, but she is nevertheless killed by Sinestro. Learning of her demise, the Guardians view her as dying in disgrace as a Red Lantern and renegade despite Jordan's protests.

Following the rise of Nekron and the Black Lantern Corps a Black Lantern Ring attached itself to Laira's corpse and she was revived as a Black Lantern. After Nekron's defeat at the hands Hal Jordan and his newly formed White Lantern Corps, Laira's ring was destroyed reverting her to a corpse.

Laira's trial is referred to in The New 52, in Green Lantern Corps (vol. 3) #9. In DC Rebirth, she is seen among the fallen Green Lanterns in the Emerald Space.

Laira is featured in the 2011 anthology film, Green Lantern: Emerald Knights voiced by Kelly Hu.

Laira makes a non-speaking appearance in the Tomorrowverse film, Green Lantern: Beware My Power as one of the many Green Lanterns killed by Sinestro and a possessed Hal Jordan on Oa

Lashorr
The Green Lantern of Sector 3453, she first appeared in Green Lantern (vol. 4) #12 (July 2006) in a story written by Geoff Johns and drawn by Ivan Reis. Lashorr had a fling with a younger Salaak before she vanished in combat with the Dominators. She is discovered alive on the Manhunter home world of Biot and returned to her sector, albeit with a case of post-traumatic stress disorder.

Relok Hag
Sector 173; First appeared in Green Lantern (vol. 4) #12. Relok is a centaur-like barbarian who leads a crusade against the Dominators for experimenting on his people. He vanished in battle with them alongside #Lashorr and others, only to be found alive on Biot.

Tomar-Tu

Green Lantern Honor Guard
The Honor Guard is an elite group of Lanterns who serve as troubleshooters and special operatives.

Apros
The Green Lantern of Sector 3. Apros first appeared in Tales of the Green Lantern Corps #1 (May 1981) in a story written by Mike W. Barr and Len Wein, with pencils by Joe Staton. Apros is a sentient plant from the planet -7pi. It is one of the Corps' oldest and most decorated veterans. Apros serves in the Honor Guard during the war with Krona and Nekron, but appears to have returned to a sector patrol position following the rebuilding of the Corps.

K'ryssma
Sector 1890; First appeared in Tales of the Green Lantern Corps #1. K'ryssma is an insectoid alien resembling a human-like butterfly. She is trapped in a chrysalis state during the rampage of the mad Guardian Appa Ali Apsa. She emerges in a completely different form on the Mosaic world. After the destruction of the Corps at the hands of Parallax, K'ryssma joined the Darkstars, and as such she was murdered by Grayven.

Tomar-Re

Guy Gardner and Kyle Rayner have also served as Honor Guard members.

The Alpha Lanterns
The Alpha Lanterns are Corps members who have been transformed into cyborgs and act as the Corps' Internal Affairs officers.

Boodikka

Chaselon
See description above in The Lost Lanterns.

Green Man

Kraken

Part of the duo (with Raker Qarrigat) dedicated to bringing peace to their homeworld of Apokolips, she becomes an Alpha Lantern to further this goal, unaware of the toll it will take on her emotions. Later, in Final Crisis, she is possessed by the malevolent spirit of the New God Granny Goodness, who uses her to subdue the Green Lanterns of Earth, Hal Jordan and John Stewart, and capture Batman for use as a scientific test subject by her master, Darkseid. When Jordan is put on trial for an attempted murder actually performed by Kraken/Goodness herself, she is unmasked by Kyle Rayner and Guy Gardner before sentence can be passed, and attempts at her primary mission, to obtain the central Green Lantern Power Battery for Darkseid. She is then defeated by Jordan and taken into custody by the other Alpha Lanterns. Following the restoration of reality at the closing of the Crisis, she is not seen among the other Alpha Lanterns, and her current status is not made apparent.

Varix
Sector 69; First appeared in Tales of the Green Lantern Corps Annual #2. Varix comes from the planet Naktos, which was devastated by a yellow plague. This and the fact that his predecessor died of a mysterious brain disease has led Varix to become a hypochondriac. Varix is described by Vurytt as his religion being his uniform, and in Varix's own words, as living for "justice and justice alone". Varix states that his people live to obey the law, and there has not been a murder on his planet for over 74 years (however, murderers on his world cannot be sentenced to more than two years of imprisonment). His dedication to justice came to a head when the Alpha Lanterns attempted to execute John Stewart when he killed another Green Lantern while the two were being held captive by enemies of the Corps and the other Lantern was about to reveal crucial information. Recognising that John's actions had been committed for the right reasons even if they were questionable on the surface, Varix assisted the Green Lanterns in destroying the other Alpha Lanterns before he destroyed himself.

The Corpse
The Corpse are a black ops division of the Green Lantern Corps who use a disc that is swallowed that imitate the abilities of a power ring but appear purple in color.

Von Daggle
The leader of the Corpse, Von Daggle is a Durlan who was called back into service following the return of the Guardians of the Universe after their deaths at the hands of Parallax. His initial recruits for the new Corpse was Guy Gardner and R'amey Holl.

R'amey Holl
Sector 700, she first appeared in Green Lantern Corps #7. She was an entomomorphic humanoid, exhibiting traits similar to those of a butterfly. R'amey was a member of the Corps covert group known as The Corpse. She later disappeared and was last seen by Guy Gardner and hasn't been heard of in one year. Due to the undercover nature of her operations, no one is looking for her at the time. She appears in several group scenes in the live-action Green Lantern film and the blind box mini toyline.

The First Seven
During the rise of the First Lantern, 10 billion years ago, before the creation of the Manhunters and the Green Lantern Corps per se, Rami, the most brilliant of the Guardians of the Universe and Volthoom's closest friend, created seven Green Power Rings to seek out worthy wielders using the Great Heart for guidance. Those chosen became The First Seven, charged with bringing Volthoom to justice, however the rings are also extremely dangerous as they were untested and had no safeguards which does not guarantee the survival of its bearers. The first seven Green Lanterns are as follow:

Alitha
Alitha of Galatica was an Old God warrior from the Third World, the world that pre-dates the Fourth World with Mister Miracle and Darkseid and Orion. The Third World was a universe consumed by war, but Alitha stood out and made a very courageous decision that not only alters the future of her people but also puts her on the path to becoming one of the Original Seven Green Lanterns. She became Green Lantern 001 and was killed in battle by Volthoom and her body is currently located in the Vault of Shadows.

Z'Kran Z'Rann
Z'Kran Z'Rann of Mars was a White Martian that, as a child, saw his entire village been massacred by a bunch of White Martians vagabonds and he was the only one to survive but not without scars. Ten years later, an elder Z'Kran Z'Rann now known as the Stranger and wearing the same style of costume as the Martian Manhunters use currently today, tracked the vagabonds and killed them all. With his vengeance concluded he is reached by one of the seven Original Seven Green Lanterns. He became Green Lantern 002 and was killed in battle by Volthoom- His body is currently located in the Vault of Shadows.

Tyran'r the Mighty
Tyran'r of Tamaran is a tiger-man and apparently a thief among his peers. He was eventually caught and delivered to Mrak'r the Wizard King of Tamaran, who broke Tyran'r's mighty sword. Tyran'r however soon got his revenge by breaking free and killed Mrak'r and his henchmen in a sudden battle that changed the course of his life forever and puts him on the path to becoming one of the Original Seven Green Lanterns. He became Green Lantern 003 and is the only of the original lanterns to be alive and also is the keeper of the Vault of Shadows where the remains of the others are located. Curiously he also recognises Simon Baz and Jessica Cruz as old friends, even though they somehow are unable to remember even meeting a hulking tiger man with a giant sword much less befriending him. As it turns out Simon Baz and Jessica Cruz are sent billion years to the past where they meet Tyran'r and the other original Green Lanterns. Together they are able to defeat Volthoom but not without casualties. As Simon and Jessica are returned to the present day, Tyran'r resigned his green lantern ring to Baz.

Kaja Dox
Kaja Dox of Yod-Colu was a young female whose third-level intelligence, puts her as one of the highest on the planet. She's not a great warrior of her people but is instead a computer repair person living with her girlfriend and struggling with an overbearing mother. The love she feels for her simple life over the frustration of her day job puts her on the path to becoming one of the Original Seven Green Lanterns. Her body is currently located in the Vault of Shadows.

Jan-Al
Jan-Al of Krypton was a member of Krypton's first mission colonization, chosen to be brave on behalf of their people. Their ship came into contact with an unknown star type "purple sun" that immobilized the ship and destroyed their communication systems. The group barely managed to escape to the nearest planet which was a hellish wasteland but nevertheless was claimed in the name of their planet. When a sandstorm reach the group, Jan-Al decision on staying on the ground instead of seeking shelter inside the arc not only proved courageous but also alters her future and of her explorer group when they noticed that the storm destroyed the arc which puts her in the path of becoming one of the original Green Lanterns. She is also the first to learn about the instability of these power rings when her willpower exceeds 2000% which essentially overcharged her ring and killed her.

Calleen
Calleen of Alstair was the first sentient element plant born on the dead planet Alstair, long consumed with fire from heavens. Her refuse to give up in the face of extinction allowed the planet over the centuries to thrived with life which eventually puts her on the path to becoming one of the Original Seven Green Lanterns. She became Green Lantern 006 and was killed in battle by Volthoom. Her body is currently located in the Vault of Shadows.

Brill
Brill of Grenda, was a member of the vast artificial intelligence known as the Hive, a collective mind whose computer intelligence allows them to know so much about the Universe but lack the knowledge about themselves. In order to find their purpose and origins, Brill was chosen among the one billion techno-organic brothers and sisters to be the first of their kind to leave the sanctity of the Hive and was given a vessel in order to journey into the Universe alone. When the vessel was ready, Brill separated himself from the collective consciousness and became the Insulatusnaut of the Hive. Isolated for the first time Brill was soon afterwards chosen to becoming one of the Original Seven Green Lanterns. Brill became Green Lantern 007 and its vessel was obliterated by Volthoom which its currently located in the Vault of Shadows.

Other Green Lanterns

Aa
Sector 904; First appeared in Green Lantern (vol. 3) #21 (February 1992).

Adam
Sector 1055; First appeared in Green Lantern Quarterly #5 (Summer 1993).

Alia
Sector 281; first appeared in Valor #5 (March 1993).

Amanita
Sector 3100; First appeared in Green Lantern (vol. 3) #20 (January 1992).

Arx
The Green Lantern of Sector 488. He first appeared in Green Lantern Corps (vol. 2) #1 (August 2006), in a story written by Dave Gibbons and penciled by Patrick Gleason. Arix is killed in a Sinestro Corps ambush in Final Crisis: Rage of the Red Lanterns #1 (December 2008).

Ash
Sector 658; (full name Ashel Sabian Formanta), a tattooed purple humanoid with vaguely occult designs on his jacket. First appeared in Green Lantern Quarterly #7 (Winter, 1993). Ash's primary concern was to hunt the "bloodseekers" (vampire-like aliens) who killed his beloved Tasha, and he joined the GLC in order to pursue these creatures into "the darkest corners of the cosmos". He was tasked by the Guardian known as Scar to find the Anti-Monitor's corpse. He finds the Anti-Monitor's armor. He later meets with Saarek, who was also sent to find the Anti-Monitor. The two find the Black Lantern Power Battery, only to be killed by two giant hands that rise up from the ground. He and Saarek are last seen on Ryut with Scar as Black Lanterns.

Ash-Pak-Glif
Sector 312. A rock like humanoid, it first appeared in Green Lantern 80-Page Giant #3 (August 2000).

B'dg
First appeared in Green Lantern (vol. 4) #4 (October 2005). B'dg (pronounced Badge) is one of the first recruits of the reconstructed Corps. Hailing from the planet H'lven like his predecessor Ch'p, B'dg first sees action when the Spider Guild invades Oa. He is trained on how to overcome the yellow impurity weakness of his ring in the midst of battle. He later participates in the defense of Oa when it is attacked by Superboy-Prime, and again when it is attacked by the Sinestro Corps. B'dg also participates in the final battle of the Sinestro Corps War, helping defend Earth. B'dg is part of the squad sent to arrest Hal Jordan for defying Guardian orders.

During the New 52, Salaak sends B'dg to Earth to locate Hal Jordan because B'dg can blend in with the planet's indigenous creatures. He is the first alien Green Lantern encountered by Simon Baz who had inherited Hal and Sinestro's fused ring. He instructs Baz in the basics of being a Green Lantern and helps him track down Black Hand.

In other media
B'dg appears in the "DC Super-Pets" sketch of DC Nation Shorts, voiced by Elisha Yaffe. He is introduced in "World's Finest Bark", when Ace the Bat-Hound and Krypto call him in to help on a case, but cannot resist the urge to chase the squirrel-like Green Lantern. B'dg later appears in "Have Your Cake and B'dg Too", assisting Jumpa the Amazon Kangaroo as she chases down Cheetah.

He was featured on the Robot Chicken DC Comics Special in a segment called "Real Characters From the DC Universe", voiced by Tom Root. In the segment, the narrator pokes fun of the fact that B'dg is a real character. In another follow up segment, Firestorm angry that he has been lumped together with characters like Mister Banjo and B'dg turns Mister Banjo's banjo into metal and hits him before asking the narrator where B'dg is and the narrator does. Firestorm is then heard attacking B'dg with the metal banjo.

B'dg also appears in Lego DC Comics Super Heroes: The Flash, voiced by Eric Bauza, where he and Ace the Bat-Hound help the microscopic Atom repair his suit and helps the Justice League escape to the Batcave.

He is a playable character in Lego DC Super-Villains, voiced by Roger Craig Smith.

B'Shi
B'Shi is one of several Green Lanterns appearing in the "A Lantern Against the Dark: A Forgotten Tale of the Green Lantern Corps" story, from Green Lantern 80-Page Giant #3. She is a monkey-like Green Lantern from the jungle world of Suirpalam, who is recruited into the Green Lantern Corps by Raker Qarrigat (and in turn recruits Ash-Pak-Glif) as part of preparations for a Green Lantern Corps invasion of Apokolips. She participates in this invasion, and is killed along with hundreds of other Green Lanterns when it quickly turns into a debacle.

Bloobert Cob
First appeared in Green Lantern (vol. 2) #46 as a nameless background Lantern. Bloobert Cob was later given a name, sector assignment, and history as online "fanon". These details were later canonized by writer Van Jensen in Green Lantern Corps (vol. 4) #31. Bloobert Cob was the Green Lantern of Sector 74, and was one of the Lanterns captured and replaced by Durlan impostors. When the Durlan fakes were uncovered, the Durlan commanders ordered their Khund allies to execute the Lantern prisoners. A squad of Khunds shot Bloobert Cob in cold blood inside his prison cell. Bloobert Cob was quickly avenged by his fellow Lanterns, who recovered their stolen rings only moments after his execution.

Brik
First appeared in Green Lantern (vol. 3) #12 (May 1991). The Green Lantern of Sector 904, Brik comes from the planet Dryad and, like her sector partner, is composed entirely of organic rock. Originally recruited by Hal Jordan, Brik was one of hundreds of veteran Green Lanterns to return to active service upon the restoration of the Green Lantern Corps. Brik once had feelings for Jordan, and her partner, Aa, suspects that she still might. In truth, her feelings are for another Earthman. In the non-canonical Green Lantern Versus Aliens Brik perishes on the surface of the planet Mogo.

Brokk
Sector 981; First appeared in Tales of the Green Lantern Corps #1.

Bzzd
First appeared in Green Lantern Corps (vol. 2) #12 (July 2007). Bzzd is a small wasp-like Green Lantern from the planet Apiaton, assigned to sector 2261. He is the partner of Mogo. In battle, he usually creates oversized constructs (such as roller coasters and giant warheads) with his power ring. Bzzd often faces extra scrutiny from his fellow Lanterns because of his size but he has shown that his willpower is as strong as anyone else's.

It is revealed that his greatest fear is to be stripped of his ring and returned to an insignificant insect trapped on his homeworld. He gives his life to defeat Mongul II. He dies defending a team of his fellow Lanterns. His ring was bequeathed to Mother Mercy.

Bzzd appears as a Black Lantern in Green Lantern Corps (vol. 2) #39 and is seemingly defeated and destroyed by Guy Gardner in Green Lantern Corps (vol. 2) #40, though he can be seen reforming afterward.

Bzzd has a very brief cameo in the Green Lantern live action film.

Charlie Vicker
First appeared in Green Lantern (vol. 2) #55 (September 1967) in a story written by John Broome and drawn by Gil Kane. Charlie Vicker of planet Earth is a former actor who portrayed Green Lantern in a TV show. Vicker led a fast lifestyle, and used his brother Roger as an understudy. One day, after a hectic night of parties, Roger filled in for his incapacitated brother. Roger was killed in a live television broadcast by an alien that had mistaken him for the real Green Lantern. A repentant Charlie works with Green Lantern to bring the aliens to justice. The Guardians, impressed with Charlie's spirit, make him a Green Lantern of sector 3319  Charlie Vicker was the second human to join the Green Lantern Corps after Hal Jordan. His time as a Green Lantern is marked with difficulty, as his sector is populated entirely by non-humanoid aliens. Eventually, he comes to feel compassion for his alien charges.

After the dissolution of the Corps, he was recruited into the Darkstars organization by John Stewart. He later died in battle, defending the planet Rann from the alien despot Grayven.

Cimfet Tau
Sector 3588; First appeared in Tales of the Green Lantern Corps Annual #2.

The Collective
When the Guardians of the Universe sent TO-T-U-K to a planet to find his replacement as the Green Lantern of Sector 1287, he couldn't find another sentient creature on the entire planet. When he observed the Collective trap and consume a bird-like creature, he learned that the Collective's mental aptitudes increased. TO-T-U-K realizing that if he allowed himself and the power battery to be consumed by the Collective then it would gain the ability to think and act. He also gave the Collective a power battery.

Because of the large number of orbs that make up the Collective and the ability of the Collective to spread out Sector 1287 is considered to be one of the safest in the universe.

Dalor
Sector 2813; First appeared in Green Lantern (vol. 2) #154.

Dkrtzy RRR
Dkrtzy RRR of Sector 188 is a bio-sentient mathematical equation. He is first mentioned in Green Lantern (vol. 2) #188 (May 1985) in the story "Mogo Doesn't Socialize", written by Alan Moore and drawn by Dave Gibbons. It was apparently discovered by a mathematician named Timph Rye in an attempt to prove that willpower could be derived formulaically. Dkrzty's method of eliminating its enemies is erasing their minds by entering them, noted as a source of controversy by the Guardians. Although it has yet to make an actual appearance, Tomar-Re claiming that his nature means that only the Guardians are aware of his presence even if he attends the Corps gatherings. Dkrtzy's bio was included in Green Lantern/Sinestro Corps Secret Files.

Driq
First appeared in Green Lantern (vol. 2) #217 (October 1987). Driq of Criq was killed by Sinestro and Sentient Sector 3600, but his ring inexplicably prevented his life force from escaping his body. Thus, he remained in a not-quite-dead state, though his physical body exhibited signs of decomposition and his costume was ragged and tattered. Each time he is destroyed, the ring reanimates his body. When Sinestro was executed and all of the Green Lantern rings lost their power, Driq collapsed into a final death. During the Blackest Night, Driq was revived as a half Black Lantern, with the right side of his body unaffected with ring intact. Unlike the rest of the Black Lanterns, Driq retained his true personality, speaking words of encouragement to John Stewart through his ring, and eventually leading his former comrade to the mass of black rings that were holding the reconstituted Xanshi together.

Eddore
Eddore from the planet Tront was a gaseous creature, vaguely amoeboid in appearance. He died during Crisis on Infinite Earths. Eddore, along with Arisia, were created by writer Mike W. Barr in his Tales of the Green Lantern Corps miniseries as a tip of the hat to E.E. Smith's Lensman series. Arisia and Eddore are the planets of the series' super-intelligent benevolent and evil races, respectively.

Ekron
Ekron from an unknown planet, was a giant floating head with a smaller alien inside "piloting" the large head of Ekron.
Ekron had one of its eyes, the mystic "Emerald Eye of Ekron" later used by the villainous Emerald Empress in Legion of Super-Heroes, ripped out by Lobo. Ekron later teamed-up with Animal Man, Adam Strange, Starfire, and Lobo against Lady Styx. Ekron dies in this battle, driving Lady Styx into a Sun-Eater.

Ermey
Ermey first appeared in Blackest Night: Tales of the Corps #3 (September 2009); he was the drill sergeant who trained Kilowog. He trained new recruits brutally, but only so they would be strong enough to survive as Lanterns. He was killed during a surprise attack on a group of Lanterns. It was from Ermey that Kilowog picked up the term "Poozer" which means "Useless Rookie". Ermey's name (and physical appearance) is a reference to the actor R. Lee Ermey, who has portrayed Drill Sergeants/figures of military authority in films such as Full Metal Jacket.

Ermey is later resurrected as a Black Lantern, with a more militaristic costume (and using his ring to create a black energy construct of a ceremonial sabre), in a gamble to stir powerful emotions in Kilowog by berating and abusing him for having once saved Sinestro's life and for having failed to train the now dead rookies. The reanimated Ermey enjoys some success as he is able to stir a reaction into Kilowog: a powerful rage against himself. However, before he can claim Kilowog's heart, he and the rest of the fallen Lanterns are ordered to devour the Oan main power battery.

A character very similar to Ermey is featured in the Kilowog section of the 2011 Green Lantern: Emerald Knights animated film. He was named Deegan, and was voiced by Wade Williams.

Flodo Span
Flodo Span is a gaseous member of the Green Lantern Corps. He has no corporeal body, and holds himself together with his ring. He was a friend of Hal Jordan's, and a member of the Green Lantern Corps of the Kylminade.

Galius Zed
Galius Zed is the Green Lantern of sector 1138. He first appeared in Tales of the Green Lantern Corps #2 (June 1981) in the story "Defeat!", written by Mike W. Barr and Len Wein, and drawn by Brian Bolland and Joe Staton. Galius is of a race of aliens whose bodies are enormous heads, with normal sized legs and arms. He was first introduced fighting alongside Hal Jordan during the war against Krona and Nekron. He has participated in many battles alongside his fellow Green Lantern Corps, and served as part of the invasion force sent to Qward to destroy the Anti-Green Lantern Corps. He was trusted to take part in the "psychodrama" in which Hal Jordan was tested on his capabilities of being a Green Lantern. Galius survived the Crisis on Infinite Earths, but lost his power ring after the trial of Sinestro and the subsequent collapse of the Main Power Battery on Oa.

After the destruction of the Corps, John Stewart was chosen by the Controllers for the Darkstars. John recruited Galius along with many other former Lanterns. Their first mission was to Talyn, a planet which had been devastated by Psimon. Galius Zed later went to Earth to drive off an alien crime syndicate.

When Grayven, the third son of Darkseid arose, the Darkstars stood up to fight him. After the Darkstars, with the aid of Kyle Rayner, defeated Grayven, Galius Zed, Munchukk, Chaser Bron, and Ferrin Colos remained on Rann to help Adam Strange rebuild the battered city of Ranagar. The Darkstars were soon needed to fight once more, this time against the threat of Hyathis. The would-be Empress of Rann used mind control to pit the Zaredians against the Darkstars, creating a diversion while she kidnapped Aleea, the daughter of Adam Strange. Hyathis might have succeeded but for the arrival of Superboy and the Ravers who helped to crush her plans.

Galius Zed was killed by the warrior Fatality who had been cutting down every Green Lantern she came across in revenge for John Stewart's failure to prevent the destruction of her home planet Xanshi. Zed is memorialized in the Crypts of Oa and is regarded by many to be a legendary Green Lantern. Zed is one of the many fallen Lanterns to be risen from his grave on Oa to become a Black Lantern. In Blackest Night #1, he is one of the many Black Lanterns beginning a stand against the living Green Lanterns on Oa.

Galius appears in the Justice League episodes "Hearts and Minds" and "In Blackest Night", voiced by René Auberjonois. He has a small role in the direct to video animated film Green Lantern: Emerald Knights, voiced by Bruce Timm. He appears briefly in the backgrounds in a few scenes in the live-action Green Lantern film and is part of the toyline.

Ganthet

During the Blackest Night crisis, Ganthet, a Guardian and one of Hal Jordan's allies, appoints himself as a deputy Green Lantern to aid Earth's heroes against Nekron and his Black Lantern Corps.

G'nort

G'Hu
Sector 2937; First appeared in Green Lantern Corps #1, and also appears in a background cameo in the Green Lantern live-action film and is also a part of the film toyline. He also appears in the animated film Green Lantern: Emerald Knights, as one of the first four Green Lanterns to be chosen.

Gpaak
Sector 3515; First appeared in Guy Gardner #11.

Gretti
The Green Lantern Gretti is part of a traveling caravan of "space gypsies" and refuses to stay in one place, roaming from sector to sector at the whim of his caravan. His superiors at the Corps say nothing since he still files his reports on time, but his sector partner Green Man has lately been less and less pleased with the situation. He is slain by Agent Orange, the keeper of the orange light of avarice.

Harvid
Sector 2937; First appeared in Green Lantern (vol. 2) #161.

Horoq Nnot
Sector 885; First appeared in Green Lantern (vol. 4) #11. Slain in the purge of Alpha Lanterns.

Iolande
Sector 1417; First appeared in Green Lantern Corps (vol. 2) #1. Iolande is a princess from planet Betrassus, and Soranik Natu's partner on Sector 1417. She and Natu have clashed during the beginning of their careers as Green Lanterns; however, they eventually get along. She is the only one in the Corps who is aware of her partner's true parentage to Sinestro. She appears in cameos in the Green Lantern: First Flight animated film, more prominently in the Emerald Knights animated film, and has a brief cameo in the Green Lantern live action film. She is also featured prominently in several episodes of Green Lantern: The Animated Series, voiced by Tara Strong.

Isamot Kol

Kaylark
Sector 1721; First appeared in Green Lantern (vol. 2) #166.

Kho Kharhi
The Green Lantern of Sector 442. She first appeared in Wonder Woman (vol. 3) #19, and was created by Gail Simone and Bernard Chang. Kho is the young daughter of a Khund Ambassador, and was accepted into the Corps due to her strong sense of justice and compassion.

Krista X
Sector 863; First appeared in Green Lantern (vol. 2) #166.

Lan Dibbux
Sector 3192; Showcase '93 #12

Larvox
The Green Lantern of Sector 0017. It first appeared in Green Lantern (vol. 2) #9 in the story "Battle of the Power Rings!", written by John Broome and illustrated by Gil Kane. Larvox is an asexual being that comes from a planet where all beings are part of the whole and there are no individuals. Larvox cannot speak and must use its ring to communicate. After the fall of Oa, Larvox becomes a member of the Darkstars, but rejoins the Corps when the Green Lanterns are reformed.

Larvox has a cameo appearance in the Green Lantern: The Animated Series episode "Reboot".

Leezle Pon
Leezle Pon is a sentient smallpox virus, first mentioned in Green Lantern (vol. 2) #188 (May 1985). He defeated the Sinestro Corps viral villain Despotellis at the crux of the Sinestro Corps War when Guy Gardner was discovered to have been infected with the virus.

Meadlux
Sector 1776; First appeared in Green Lantern (vol. 2) #169.

Medphyll

Mogo
Mogo is a sentient and living planet. It is technically genderless, but it is often casually referred to as male. When it is desired, its affiliation with the Corps is shown with foliage arranged into a green band, marked with the standard Green Lantern Corps lantern symbol, circling Mogo's equatorial area.

Mogo first appeared in Green Lantern (vol. 2) #188 (May 1985) in a story titled "Mogo Doesn't Socialize" and was created by writer Alan Moore and artist Dave Gibbons. Although initially a one-off character from a short story, the planet has grown in importance in the Green Lantern mythos and is a necessary part of the process for distributing power rings as well as a destination for Corps members to recuperate.

Morro
A Green Lantern from Sector 666. Guy Gardner revealed to Kyle Rayner that Morro requested his duty as penance, as he killed his pets' mother in rage when he wrongfully thought it ate his brother (who was later found alive and well). His first act of atoning for his mistake was to adopt the creature's offspring as his own. Months later, after his brother's death (a natural cause) and the Sinestro Corps War, Morro chose to be the Corps' cryptkeeper. Morro is capable of combat and hunting without his ring, and his primary choice of weapon is his mallet. His dratures are fearsome dragon-like creatures loyal to their master and ready to aid him.

Mother Mercy
Matris Ater Clementia, or Mother Mercy, is the creator of the Black Mercy plants used by Mongul, and the new Lantern for Sector 2261. She initially created them to find people who are suffering and dying to ease their pain, which created a symbiotic relationship with her. However, the first Mongul discovered the plants and used them to spread his evil, even mutating some of the Black Mercys into giving their victims suffering. Mother Mercy, however, kept her sentience hidden from Mongul. Her abilities to both ease and create fear gave her both a Green Lantern Corps ring and a Sinestro Corps ring to choose from. The Green Lantern ring, which she ultimately chose, came from the recently deceased Bzzd. Mother Mercy first appeared in Green Lantern Corps (vol. 2) #24 (July 2008).

NautKeLoi
Naut Ke Loi first appeared in Green Lantern (vol. 2) #9 (December 1961), and was created by John Broome and Gil Kane. NautKeLoi is the Lantern of Aeros, a planet entirely covered by water. As he cannot breathe air, he is always seen wearing a glass helmet filled with water. He is included as an action figure in the DC Universe Classics Green Lantern Classics subline for 2011. He appears briefly in the live-action Green Lantern film, and also appears in group scenes in the animated films Green Lantern: First Flight and Green Lantern: Emerald Knights.

Okonoko
The Green Lantern of Sector 1110. He first appeared in Green Lantern (vol. 2) #162 (March 1983), and was created by Mike W. Barr. Okonoko is an oranges skinned humanoid with pointed ears, who retired from the Corp after training his replacement Deeter.

Olapet
Olapet was a plant-based Green Lantern, hailing from the planet of Southern Goldstar. She first appeared in Green Lantern Corps #217 (October 1987), and was created by Steve Englehart and Joe Staton. Olapet carries a seedling of herself in a pouch. She periodically dies and transfers both her memories and the Power Ring to the seedling. She, along with Driq and Flodo Span, were the sole survivors of the Green Lantern Corps of Laminate. The rest were killed by Sinestro and Sentient Sector 3600.

Oliversity
Sector 2111; First appeared in The Green Lantern Corps #222. Can create multiple effects with his venom.

Opto309v
Sector 2260; First appeared in 52 Week 41. Featured in Final Crisis #2, slain by Kalibak two issues later.

Orlan
Sector 3897; First appeared in The Brave and the Bold (vol. 3) #19. Orlan was from the planet Kahlo. He destroyed a major city of his home planet while under the control of a malevolent energy being, but was later freed from its influence by the Phantom Stranger.

Palaqua
The Green Lantern of sector 3600, he first appeared in Tales of the Green Lantern Corps Annual #2. He has also appeared in the Justice League Unlimited animated series and appears in a cameo in the Green Lantern: First Flight animated film. He also appears in a speaking role in the Green Lantern: Emerald Knights animated film.

Penelops
Protecting sector 1355, he first appeared in Tales of the Green Lantern Corps #3. He was a veteran Green Lantern who was re-recruited when the Corps returned. He appears in cameos in the animated films Green Lantern: First Flight and Green Lantern: Emerald Knights

Penn Maricc
The Green Lantern of Sector 3333. He first appeared in Tales of the Green Lantern Corps Annual #2 (December 1986), and was created by Mindy Newell and George Freeman. A hot-headed braggart, he frequently clashes with the equally hot headed Guy Gardner.

Perdoo
The Green Lantern of Sector 2234. He first appeared in Green Lantern (vol. 3) Annual #5 (1996), and was created by Len Wein and Bill Willingham. Perdoo is from the planet Qualar IV, whose natives resemble chicken like humanoids and are unusually timid. The first several Qualarians that were approached by the ring died of fright. Perdoo is the only member of his race without fear, and is therefore considered clinically insane by his fellow Qualarians. His name is a reference to Frank Perdue.

Procanon Kaa
Sector 442; First appeared in Green Lantern Corps #224 (May 1988): "The Ultimate Testament!". Despised by the Khunds.

Qurina Vint
Sector 282; First appeared in Green Lantern Corps (vol. 2) #61 (August 2011): "Beware My Power".

Recruited by Mogo during the War of the Green Lanterns. Her home planet is Calados, former police officer.

Raker Qarrigat

Reever of Xanshi
Sector 1313; First appeared in Green Lantern (vol. 2) #130 (July 1980): "The Trial of Arkkis Chummuck: Indictment".

Remnant Nod
Sector 1132; Noted for opposing political oppression. Killed by Red Lantern Corps member Atrocitus.

Rori Dag
Sector 1234; The first Green Lantern.

Rot Lop Fan
Rot Lop Fan is one of several unorthodox members of the Green Lantern Corps created by Alan Moore in Tales of the Green Lantern Corps Annual #3 (1987). After his introduction, he later occasionally appears in Green Lantern Corps group scenes.

In the Tales of the Green Lantern Corps Annual #3 story "In the Blackest Night", Katma Tui is sent by the Guardians of the Universe to a lightless region of space known as the Obsidian Deeps, in order to recruit a new Green Lantern to protect that region of space. Despite the absolute darkness of the Deeps, Katma's power ring led her unerringly to a completely fearless and honest resident of the Deeps: Rot Lop Fan. However, as Rot Lop Fan's species had evolved in darkness, they had no concept of light and color, and thus Katma Tui was unable to explain how the power ring worked (it projects solid rays of light manifested by the bearer's will power).

Realizing that his species operates by hearing, Katma coaches him to create a hand bell with the ring, and describes the Green Lantern Corps as the "F-Sharp Bell Corps" — "F-Sharp" being a reassuring note for Rot Lop Fan's race in the same manner that green is a reassuring color, and the ring's powers in terms of sound instead of light. She also composes a new oath for him to recite:

In loudest din or hush profound
my ears hear evil's slightest sound
let those who toll out evil's knell
beware my power, the F-Sharp Bell!

Having solved this dilemma, Katma leaves Rot Lop Fan to protect his people, not mentioning the ring's weakness to yellow as the colourless space made it relatively pointless; although, she privately notes that in some ways, Rot Lop Fan cannot be counted as a member of the "Green Lantern" Corps as he has truthfully never heard of them.

Rot Lop Fan later appears in several group scenes, including in the Crisis on Infinite Earths storyline when the Guardians of the Universe depart this plane of existence with the Zamarons, at the trial of Sinestro, on page 3 of the bar scene in Green Lantern (vol. 3) #56 (November 94) and in a group of ex-Green Lanterns freed from slavers by Warrior.

Rot Lop Fan has apparently been reinstated as a Green Lantern after the rebirth of the Corps. He appears in the backgrounds in a few scenes in the Green Lantern live-action film and is part of the 8-inch toyline.

Saarek
Saarek claims to be able to speak with the dead. He helps his fellow Lanterns track and capture the Sinestro Corps member who has been killing rookie Lantern's families, and is later tasked by a rogue Guardian, Scar, to find and speak with the Anti-Monitor's corpse. He later encounters Ash, who was also sent to find the Anti-Monitor, and the two decide to join forces. As they continue their journey, the voices of the dead grow so loud that they rupture Saarek's eardrums, deafening him. The two find the Black Lantern Power Battery, only to awaken the dormant power of the battery itself as two giant hands rise up from the ground and chase them, seeking flesh. He and Ash do not survive the conflict and are later seen as Black Lanterns at Scar's side on Ryut.

Shilandra Thane
Sector 3399; First appeared in Green Lantern Corps Quarterly #1.

Shorm
Sector 48. He first appeared in Green Lantern Corps: Recharge #1. Shorm is the acting desk sergeant of the Corps and is a close partner of Salaak. He appears in cameos in the Green Lantern: First Flight animated film and Green Lantern: Emerald Knights.

Sinestro

Skirl
Sector 2689; First appeared in Green Lantern (vol. 2) #222.

Skyrd
Sector 3181; First appeared in Tales of the Green Lantern Corps #1.

Sodam Yat

Soranik Natu

Stel

T-Cher
The Green Lantern of Sector 1324, T-Cher first appeared in Green Lantern (vol. 2) #167 (August 1983). T-Cher is a robot that had acted as the mechanical caregiver for the children of Green Lantern Brin. After Brin's retirement, the Guardians select T-Cher as his replacement.

Thulka Re
Little is known about Thulka Re save for the fact that he patrolled Sector 423. During a mission to the recently decimated world of Talcyion Omega, Thulka and his fellow Corpsmen were attacked by an army of powerful snakes known as the Silver Serpents. Thulka sacrificed his life in order to buy his companions time to escape, and was ultimately killed and consumed by the reptiles. His first and only appearance was in Wonder Woman (vol. 3) #42.

Torquemada
Torquemada is a powerful sorcerer as well as a Green Lantern. He first appeared in Green Lantern Corps Quarterly #4 (Spring 1993).

In the "Origins and Omens" back-up story in Green Lantern (vol. 4) #38 (March 2009), Torquemada is shown in manacles standing in front of the Guardians next to the sorcerer Mordru and Green Lantern Alan Scott, their fingers stretched out in accusation.

In Final Crisis: Legion of 3 Worlds #5 (September 2009), Torquemada and Alan Scott are shown imprisoned in a wall on the Sorcerers World in the 31st Century.

T-O-T-U-K
A successor of Green Lantern AR-N-O-Q, TO-T-U-K served as a Green Lantern of Sector 1287 for nearly three thousand years until the events of the Crisis on Infinite Earths forced him into retirement. TO-T-U-K had no desire to retire from the Green Lantern Corps and actually preferred to dying in the line of duty. However, it was the will of the Guardians that TO-T-U-K pass his power ring to another. TO-T-U-K was sent to Valstan C5, a planet in the fifth sector of the globular cluster of Sector 1287, where he will find his successor.

Upon arriving in Valstan C5, TO-T-U-K scanned the planet to find a worthy heir but for reasons unknown to him his ring apparently failed to pinpoint his replacement. Initially confused, TO-T-U-K soon realized that the individual he had been looking for was a hive-mind cluster of floating organisms that were floating around him, called the Collective. The Collective, however, was insufficient to become a Green Lantern due to possessing a lower functioning intelligence. But TO-T-U-K learned that the Collective has the ability to absorb the essence of an ensnared lifeform, which would also absorb the personality and intelligence of the lifeform as it was assimilated into the Collective. TO-T-U-K realized that it was possible for the Collective to absorb his power battery and in doing so, each organism of the Collective would become a living power ring.

TO-T-U-K understood what he had to do in which he allowed himself to be absorbed by the Collective; his sacrifice provided the intelligence and higher reasoning the Collective needed to become a Green Lantern.

Tuebeen
The Green Lantern of Sector 918, Tuebeen's sole appearance is in Green Lantern (vol. 2) #155 (August 1982).

Turytt

Vath Sarn
Vath Sarn first appeared in DC Comics' Green Lantern Corps: Recharge #1 (November 2005), and was created by writers Geoff Johns and Dave Gibbons, and artist Patrick Gleason. The character is from the planet Rann, initially depicted as a veteran soldier of the Rann-Thanagar War, resulting in some tensions between him and his sector partner Isamot Kol, a soldier from Thanagar who was nevertheless more willing to look past their old conflict than Sarn. However, over time, the two move past their war history and become friends; when Sarn loses his legs during the Black Lantern Corps' assault on Oa, Kol actually has his own legs surgically transplanted onto Sarn, reasoning that his physiology will allow him to re-grow his lost limbs and wanting to give his friend the chance to continue his service in the Corps. Later, Vath is part of a small group of Lanterns who, by recruitment and circumstance, assist in taking down the original Guardians, who had gone mad with power.

Venizz
Sector 2812; First appeared in Green Lantern (vol. 4) #6 (January 2006). Venizz is the partner of Green Lantern Tagort. Noted for her opposition to eugenics.

Voz
Voz is close to Graf Toren, having been a fellow captive for a long time before Guy Gardner rescued them. Voz is assigned to be the warden of the Sciencells. It is a great honor to him, and he takes it very seriously. The Red Lantern Corps member Vice breaks free of his prison with the help of Scar and starts a riot. He breaks free many Sinestro Corps members too and Voz attempts to quell the riot singlehandedly, however Vice easily overpowers him. Voz is badly injured but survives. He appears in a cameo in the Green Lantern live-action film and is also a part of the film toyline.

Wissen
Sector 1915; First appeared in Tales of the Green Lantern Corps Annual #3 (1987). Wissen used his powers as a Green Lantern to end a thousand-year civil war on the planet Veltre. Wissen is eventually regarded by the natives of Veltre as a god, and under his benevolent rule the planet becomes peaceful but stagnant. After many years as the planet's ruler, a trio of Green Lanterns arrive to stabilize Veltre's core before it explodes like the planet Krypton. At first humbled by his failure, Wissen is persuaded to remain on Veltre to continue to act as its protector.

Xax
Xax of Xaos is a grasshopper-like alien from a planet ruled by insects. He first appeared in Green Lantern (vol. 2) #9 and becomes one of Hal Jordan's good friends in the Corps. He was slain during a battle on the moon of Qward during the Crisis on Infinite Earths. Another grasshopper shaped Lantern named Xax is later slain and worn as an earring by Lady Styx. It's interesting to note that in his first appearance Xax does not use a ring, but a variation called a "power device" built into the insignia of his costume. Recharging it requires pressing the lantern shaped battery to his chest. All subsequent appearances show him wearing a ring. Xax appears in several scenes in both animated films, First Flight and Emerald Knights.

Zale
Zale of Bellatrix was Boodikka's replacement on the Bellatrix Bombers, and the next of her kind judged worthy by the Guardians to wield a GL ring. She first appeared in Green Lantern Corps #21. As a rookie Lantern who kept ignoring her call to duty, Zale was brought under investigation by her former sister Boodikka, now an Alpha-Lantern. After a lengthy confrontation, it was revealed that it was the Bombers who kept Zale from fulfilling her duties, by deceiving her into thinking she was needed with them. The Guardians punished Zale by making her Boodikka's sector partner and removing her power battery, making her dependent on Boodikka for recharges.

Zghithii
Sector 3599; First appeared in Green Lantern (vol. 2) #190 (July 1985). Zqhithii is a snake-like alien that helped fellow Green Lantern Xax fight off the Spider Guild invasion of Xaox.

Miscellaneous Green Lanterns

Avra
Appearing in the animated film Green Lantern: Emerald Knights in the segment "The First Lantern", a former scribe for the Guardians and one of the first four chosen Green Lanterns, when the Corps was formed. He was the first to discover the natural ability of the green light to create constructs, as it is the manifestation of willpower. Because of this he is considered the very first Green Lantern. And the knowledge of his discovery was passed down to every newly recruited Green Lantern during the ages until today.

Blu
Appearing in the animated film Green Lantern: Emerald Knights in the segment "The First Lantern", a blue-skinned humanoid female alien, also one of the first four chosen Green Lanterns. She died in battle against a massive army, as she hadn't discovered yet how to use the full power of her ring by means of her willpower. In the film, she is the first Green Lantern to die in the line of duty.

Bruce Wayne
In the "Elseworlds" title In Darkest Knight, Bruce Wayne succeeded Abin Sur as Green Lantern of Sector 2814. His version of the Lantern uniform is darker than others and includes a cowl and a black scalloped cape. During that same story, Barry Allen/Flash, Clark Kent/Kal-El/Superman, and Diana/Wonder Woman were recruited as Green Lantern candidates.

Wachet
Appearing in the animated film Green Lantern: Emerald Knights in the segment "The First Lantern", Wachet is a semi-translucent, planar alien, nominally female, who was one of the first four chosen as Green Lanterns, and the second to use the full power of her ring following Avra's discovery.

Ngila G'rnt
Appearing only in the Green Lantern live-action film, Ngila G'rnt is a native of the planet Inguanzo, and a recently recruited teenaged Green Lantern. She is endowed with an extraordinary sense of hearing, natural to her race, and is named after the costume designer of the film, Ngila Dickson.

Tai Pham
Appearing in the young adult graphic novel Green Lantern: Legacy (2020), Tai Pham is the thirteen-year-old grandson of Green Lantern Kim Tran who was selected by her power ring to become its successor. John Stewart, a frequent ally to Tran, became a mentor to Pham.

Kim Tran
Appearing in the young adult graphic novel Green Lantern: Legacy (2020), Kim Tran became a Green Lantern of Earth around the time of the Vietnam War and was a frequent ally to John Stewart. Her power ring chose her thirteen-year-old grandson Tai Pham as its successor.

Ardakian Trawl

Appearing only in the animated film Green Lantern: Emerald Knights during the introduction sequence, she is a female Green Lantern who dies after being assaulted by Krona's shadow demons. She is remembered by Ganthet as a brave and gallant Green Lantern.

Teen Lanterns

Frankie, Kelly, Jaclyn, and Samosa
Although not "official" members of the Green Lantern Corps, four teenagers — Frankie (male), Kelly (female), Jaclyn (female), and Samosa (male) — are given simplified Green Lantern rings by John Stewart after their homes are abducted to Oa by the Mad Guardian in Green Lantern (vol. 3) (1992) and Mosaic (1992–1993)..

Able to create simple objects, translate languages, synthesize atmosphere, and empower flight, these rings enabled the youngsters to explore Oa in the hopes that their youthful ways of looking at the Mosaic (and the other beings trapped there) would help ease relations between the Earthlings and other races.

Having a moderate degree of success, the four helped where they could until the Mosaic was torn apart when dozens of space fleets appeared over Oa, each planet determined to bring their people home.

Presumably the four are back on Earth readjusting to a "normal" life. At this time, it is unknown how the destruction of the Central Power Battery and subsequent reconstruction by Ion/Kyle Rayner affected the teenagers' rings. It is possible they still exist and can be recharged if given access to a Lantern.

Jordana Gardner
Another Teen Lantern, unrelated to the others and out-of-continuity is Jordana Gardner, future descendant of Hal Jordan and Guy Gardner, called in such way due to her early recruitment into the Green Lantern Corps of the alternate future detailed in Superman and the Legion of Super-Heroes in the 31st Century.

Keli Quintela
Young Justice (vol. 3) #1 (March 2019) introduced another Teen Lantern in Keli Quintela. An unofficial Green Lantern, Quintela is an eleven-year old from La Paz, Bolivia that hacked into the Green Lantern Power Battery and created a gauntlet that acts like a Green Lantern power ring.

M'ten
Appearing in the opening minutes of the Green Lantern: The Animated Series episode "Beware my Power," M'ten was the Green Lantern of an unknown sector who was assigned to Frontier Space. After being ambushed and murdered by Zilius Zox of the Red Lantern Corps, M'ten's ring returned to Oa, setting the events of the series in motion.

Shyir Rev
Appearing in the Green Lantern: The Animated Series episode "Beware My Power," Shyir Rev was a Green Lantern assigned to Frontier Space. He was ambushed and severely injured by members of the Red Lantern Corps, but was rescued by Hal Jordan and Kilowog. Shyir ultimately ended up sacrificing his life to save his home world from a massive bomb planted by the Red Lanterns, and was honored by his comrades.

Dulok
Appearing in the Green Lantern: The Animated Series episode "Heir Apparent," Dulok was a Green Lantern from the planet of Betrassus. Dulok had planned to join a band of Green Lanterns tasked with fighting off the Red Lantern Corps, but was murdered by Ragnar, the planet's crown prince. After Dulok's death, his ring passed to Iolande, the young queen of Betrassus.

Probert
Probert was a mercenary who met up with a few Lanterns and conversed with Guy Gardner at the scene of a huge spaceborne battle. A few of the newer Lanterns pointed out that Probert had once been a Lantern and was described to Guy as having been "worse than you."

Monster Menace Green Lantern
A Green Lantern from an unnamed planet who leads a team of monstrous-appearing superheroes to Earth in pursuit of Sinestro's duplicate power ring and battery. Initially masquerading as a mysterious robed ghoul, he is a bald humanoid with chalk-white skin, and first appears in Super Friends #10, created by writer E. Nelson Bridwell and artist Ramona Fradon.

Kai-Ro

Kai-Ro is Green Lantern in the future DC animated universe voiced by Lauren Tom, first appearing in the Batman Beyond two-part episode "The Call" (2000). An eight-year-old child mature beyond his age, Kai-Ro possesses the standard Green Lantern power ring and assists Terry McGinnis, the Batman of the future, in finding a supposed traitor within the ranks of the Justice League Unlimited.

Kai-Ro later appears as a young adult in the 2005 Justice League Unlimited episode "Epilogue" in Terry's daydream. Still a member of the future JLU, he defeats a group of supervillains with McGinnis' help and pleads with McGinnis to stay with the team despite the Batman's growing animosity and disillusion upon the discovery of his true origins.

A two-issue story in the Batman Beyond comic reveals that Kai-Ro had been raised in a Buddhist monastery prior to receiving the ring. In this story he returns there to battle Black Light, a character with a black power ring, somewhat similar to Sinestro. The story mentions that Kai-Ro's ring had no yellow weakness.

A character named Kairo is Green Lantern's alien sidekick in the 1967 Filmation animated series The Superman/Aquaman Hour of Adventure.

Kid Lantern
Issue #3 of the miniseries Flash and Green Lantern: The Brave and the Bold (December 2000) has Flash, Kid Flash, and Green Lantern in pursuit of Mirror Master and Black Hand. The villains attempt to steal Flash's speed but Kid Flash loses his powers instead. Green Lantern creates a temporary power ring for Wally to use, dubbing him Kid Lantern. Wally's Lantern costume is palette swap of his Kid Flash costume, with black pants, green top/boots, white gloves, and a Green Lantern insignia in place of his lightning insignia.

Daffy Duck/Duck Dodgers

In episode #9 ("The Green Loontern") of the 2003 Duck Dodgers animated series, Duck Dodgers claims his laundry at the dry-cleaners, but mistakenly takes a Green Lantern uniform instead of his usual outfit. This episode made use of discarded character concepts for a proposed Green Lantern Corps animated series. The series would have focused on the adventures of Kyle Rayner with a slightly comical version of the Corps. The episode included the first animated versions of Guy Gardner, Ch'p, and Boodikka.

Daffy also appears as The Green Loontern in Lego Batman 3: Beyond Gotham.

Green Guardsman
A Green Guardsman is featured on the Justice League animated series' season one two-part episode "Legends" (2002) as an homage to the original Alan Scott. He appears as a Justice Guild of America member on an alternate Earth that had been devastated by nuclear war, but reconstructed as a vast mental illusion by a psychic, Ray Thompson. This is a reference to the pre-Crisis on Infinite Earths crossovers between DC Comics' Multiverse (which began in September 1961 "Flash of Two Worlds"). To mirror the Golden Age Green Lantern ring's vulnerability to wood, the Green Guardsman's ring has no power over aluminum. However, the Green Guardsman proves to be a loyal superhero of a bygone era, and willingly sacrifices himself to defend the Earth he protects.

Sonya Blade

Sonya Blade's ending in the video game Mortal Kombat vs. DC Universe depicts her becoming the Green Lantern of Earthrealm after finding the ring of an unnamed Corps member who died offscreen during the game's Story Mode.

Power Ring

Power Ring is the name of several DC Comics supervillains — counterparts of Green Lanterns Hal Jordan, Kyle Rayner, and John Stewart. Originally residing on Earth-Three, which was subsequently destroyed during the 12-issue limited series Crisis on Infinite Earths, Power Ring along with the other Syndicators ended up being recreated in the Anti-Matter Universe's Earth.

Iron Lantern
Iron Lantern is a fictional character and an Amalgam Comics superhero, whose true debut was in Iron Lantern #1 (June 1997), though his first (metafictional) appearance in the Amalgam universe was in Showcase of Suspense #1. He is a combination of Marvel Comics' Iron Man and DC Comics' Green Lantern. Iron Lantern was created by writer Kurt Busiek.

Iron Lantern's origin is revealed in Iron Lantern #1. Hal Stark is the millionaire owner of Stark Aviation. While working on a prototype flight simulator, Stark is pulled to the site of a space ship by a beam of green energy. The simulator crashes, badly injuring Stark. The spaceship contains the corpse of an alien named Rhomann Sur (an amalgamation of Marvel's Rhomann Dey and DC's Abin Sur). Stark is able to use parts of the spaceship to build a superpowered suit of armor (powered by Sur's lantern) to keep himself alive. Stark then defeats the aliens responsible for Sur's death, and decides to fight evil as Iron Lantern.

Iron Lantern's other foes include Madame Sapphire (Pepper Ferris — Marvel's Madame Masque and DC's Star Sapphire), H.E.C.T.O.R. (Marvel's MODOK and DC's Hector Hammond), Oa the Living Planet (Ego the Living Planet mixed with Oa, the home planet of the Guardians of the Universe), and Mandarinestro (Marvel's Mandarin and DC's Sinestro).

Kyle O'Brien / Green Guardsman

Kyle O'Brien / Green Guardsman is an Amalgam Comics superhero whose true debut was in Iron Lantern #1, though his first (metafictional) appearance in the Amalgam universe was Showcase of Suspense #84, in a story entitled "The Other Iron Lantern". He was an amalgamation of Kevin O'Brien, the Guardsman, and Kyle Rayner, the then current Green Lantern.

Jade Yifei
Based on Jennifer-Lynn Hayden, Jade Yifei is the Green Lantern of Sector 2814 in the Ame-Comi universe. A teenager from China, she was chosen as the first Green Lantern of Earth in this continuity rather than Hal Jordan.

Doctor Spectrum (Marvel Comics)

Doctor Spectrum is the name of five different fictional comic book characters in the Marvel Comics multiverse. There have been five versions of the character to date — three supervillains from the mainstream Marvel Universe belonging to the team Squadron Sinister (Earth-616) and two heroes from different alternate universes. The two heroes each belong to a version of the team Squadron Supreme (the Squadron Supreme of Earth-712 and the Squadron Supreme of Earth-31916, respectively).

Green Lanterns by sectors of the universe
After long experimentation the Guardians equipped and loosely oversaw the Green Lantern Corps, over 7200 diverse beings from throughout the universe. Each was granted a battery and a ring. Thinly scattered among uncounted trillions of stars, each was assigned a sector of space which was vaster than anyone can comprehend.

The sectors are shaped as four-sided pyramid-shaped sections of a sphere, with their point meeting at Oa, which is located at the center of the universe. Oa is technically in each Lantern's sector, and while on Oa, the Lantern is still in his home sector

There are 3600 standard space sectors, plus three "special" sectors: 0 (Oa itself), -1 (Anti-matter universe), and 3601 (proscribed sector of space populated by the Manhunters).

See also
Green Lantern
Green Lantern Corps
Guardians of the Universe
Sinestro Corps
Doctor Spectrum
Green Lantern (film)

References

External links
The Great Book of Oa
Alan Kistler's profile on Green Lantern

Green Lantern
 
Green Lantern